The New York City mayoral election of 1945 took place on November 6, 1945 in New York City. The candidates were King County District Attorney William O'Dwyer, a Democrat, and Jonah J. Goldstein, a Republican judge, as well as other, third party candidates.

O'Dwyer won the contest with 56.77% of the vote.

References

Mayoral election
Mayoral elections in New York City
New York City mayoral
New York City
New York City mayoral election